Virginia Park 
may refer to a neighbourhood:

Canada

Virginia Park (Edmonton), Alberta, Canada
Virginia Park, St. John's, Newfoundland, Canada

United Kingdom

Virginia Park, Virginia Water, Surrey formerly the Holloway Sanatorium
Virginia Park (Caerphilly) home ground of Caerphilly RFC

United States

Virginia Park Historic District, Detroit, Michigan, United States
Virginia Park (Tampa), a neighborhood within the City of Tampa, Florida, United States